Kat Foster is an American actress known for her role as Steph Woodcock on 'Til Death.

Early life and education
Foster was born in Oakland, California and graduated from The College Preparatory School. A classically trained dramatic actress, Foster studied acting at the New York University Tisch School of the Arts.

Career 
She later performed in many off-Broadway and regional productions, including "The Democracy Project" with Naked Angels and was awarded Best Actress for her performance in "Final Countdown" at the 2003 New York International Fringe Festival. An active member of the New York City theater community, she participated in extensive readings and workshops at the Manhattan Theater Club, MCC Theater, New York Theatre Workshop, and The Public Theater, among others. 

Past TV appearances include roles on Weeds, Family Guy, The Book of Daniel, Law & Order, 'Til Death, Law & Order: Criminal Intent, Royal Pains, and Law & Order: Special Victims Unit. In addition, she starred with Bobby Cannavale and Donnie Wahlberg in the NBC pilot NY-70, a stylized police show set in the 1970s, and in the CBS pilot Webster Report, about a reluctant New York detective with Cannavale and Stanley Tucci.

Personal life
Foster's father managed bands. As a child, she danced "The Nutcracker" with the San Francisco Ballet. She is married to Jim Hustead and has one child, August Emilia Hustead, born in 2018.

Filmography

Film

Television

Video games

References

External links
 
 

American film actresses
American stage actresses
American television actresses
American voice actresses
Living people
Actresses from Oakland, California
Tisch School of the Arts alumni
21st-century American actresses
1978 births